Lorenzo Sosso (March 2, 1867 - October 1, 1965) was an Italian-American poet who published several books of poetry in the late-19th and early-20th centuries. Sosso published his first collection of poetry, Poems, when he was 21 years old, most of its contents having been written during his teenage years. In the preface to Poems, Sosso reveals his first language to have been Italian, but boasts that, despite whatever difficulties he may have had with writing poetry in English, he was "especially ordained by a superior power for such a calling." Although he was born in New York, Sosso lived in California for most of his career, especially in the San Francisco, where he was an acquaintance with more well-known participants in the city's literary scene, including Ina Coolbrith, the first poet laureate of the state. Sosso was living in the city during the 1906 San Francisco earthquake, upon which he remarked: "Out of the ashes thy life will requicken, / Courage loves fighting 'gainst terrible odds."

Bibliography
 Poems, (1888)
 Poems on humanity and Abelard to Heloise, (1891)
 In the realms of gold : a book of verse, 1891-1901, (1902)
 Proverbs of the people : a cento of aphorisms reasonably rhymed (1904)
 Wisdom for the wise; a book of proverbs, (1907)

References
Notes

Primary Sources
 The San Francisco call., December 01, 1895, Page 21, Image 21, mention of booklet series co-edited by Sosso
 The morning call., December 28, 1890, Page 10, Image 10, positive review of Sosso's Poems

External links
Works by Lorenzo Sosso
Works by or about Lorenzo Sosso on archive.org
Works by Lorenzo Sosso listed on worldcat.org

1867 births
1965 deaths
19th century in California
Writers from San Francisco
19th-century American writers
Poets from California